Bodolf Hareide (born 1 December 1937 in Hareid) is a Norwegian politician for the Conservative Party.

He served as a deputy representative to the Norwegian Parliament from Møre og Romsdal during the term 1973–1977. In total he met during 19 days of parliamentary session.

References

1937 births
Living people
Deputy members of the Storting
Conservative Party (Norway) politicians
Møre og Romsdal politicians
People from Hareid
20th-century Norwegian politicians